Amauronematus is a genus of sawflies belonging to the family Tenthredinidae.

The genus was described in 1890 by Friedrich Wilhelm Konow.

The genus has cosmopolitan distribution.

Species:
 Amauronematus amplus
 Amauronematus fasciatus
 Amauronematus histrio
 Amauronematus lateralis
 Amauronematus mcluckiei
 Amauronematus mundus
 Amauronematus neglectus
 Amauronematus sagmarius
 Amauronematus semilacteus
 Amauronematus stenogaster
 Amauronematus toeniatus
 Amauronematus vittatus
 Amauronematus viduatus
 Amauronematus puniceus

References

Tenthredinidae